Kaduna North, often referred to as the pioneer local government, is a Local Government Area in Kaduna State, Nigeria. It is the capital of Kaduna State and its headquarters are in the town of Doka. It has an area of 70.2 km2.

History 
Kaduna North is the oldest local government in the state. Its headquarters is in Doka.

Demographics 
Kaduna North is located between latitudes 10 35 North and Longitudes 7 25 East. It is bordered by Igabi local government to the North and West, and Southwest, by Kaduna South, Chikun local government to the east. It has an area of 72 km and density of 5, 883.1 inh./km. The population of Kaduna north is at 423,580 as of 2006 Nigeria population census.

Administrative subdivisions
Kaduna North Local Government Area consists of 12 subdivisions (second-order administrative divisions) or electoral wards, namely:
 Badarawa
 Dadi Riba
 Hayin Banki
 Kabala
 Kawo
 Maiburiji
 Sardauna
 Shaba
 Unguwan Dosa
 Unguwar Rimi
 Unguwar Sarki
 Unguwar Shanu

Geology
The entire Kaduna state is underlain by a basement complex of igneous and metamorphic rocks of mainly Jurassic to Pre-Cambrian ages. The basement complex rocks are essentially granites, gneisses, migmatites, schists and quartzites (Benett, 1979;13). The geology of Kaduna North is predominantly metamorphic rocks of the Nigerian basement complex consisting of biotite gneisses and older granites (Kaduna State, 2003).

The topographical relief is relatively flat, having an elevation of between 600 and 650 metres in large areas of the local government. It is over 650 metres above mean sea level (a.m.s.l.) in some places, and below 500 metres in places that slope downward towards the river.

Weather and climate
Kaduna North lies completely in the part of Western Africa, well within the northern limit of the movement of the intertropical convergence zone (ITCZ). It is characterized by two distinct seasonal regimes, oscillating between cool to hot dry and humid to wet season.

Temperature:the mean maximum

The postal code of the area is 800.

Education 
There are many educational institutions in Kaduna north that include both public and private, there are 160 primary schools belonging to the local government and 40 to private individuals which summed up to t0tal of 200 primary schools, and 13 secondary schools belonging to local government and 13 to private individuals. There are tertiary institutions that provide post secondary education in the local government, which include; Kaduna State University, Nigerian Defence Academy, Mando Advance College of Animal Science.

Economy 
Kaduna north is the largest contributor to the Kaduna state economy, there are many small and large scale companies and industries with various commercial activities. The main market in the state is located there, Kaduna Central Market, others include Kasuwar Barci (sleeping market), Kawo weekly market, Ungwan rimi and Ungwan shanu weekly markets.

Recreation 
Leisure activity and entertainment centres are located at various places within the local government, there are two stadiums Ahmadu Bello Stadium and Ranchers Bees Stadium, a public square Murtala Square was a race course now a recreational facility that attracts people for leisure activities, so also there are many hotels, entertainment hubs and tourist attraction sites, which include ASAA Pyramid, Hamdala Hotel, Hotel Seventeen, Crystal Garden, Side Resort, Arewa House, National Museum, and many more.

See also
 Kaduna South
 Southern Kaduna
 Kaduna central

References

Local Government Areas in Kaduna State